Local Economy is a peer-reviewed academic journal publishing papers on local economic development. The journal is published by SAGE Publications in association with the Local Economy Policy Unit (London South Bank University). The editor-in-chief is Andrew Jones (London South Bank University). The journal was established in 1986 and is currently published 8 times per year.

Abstracting and indexing 
Local Economy is abstracted and indexed in the Association of Business Schools' Academic Journal Quality Guide, Research Papers in Economics, and Scopus.

External links
 
 Local Economy Policy Unit

Economics journals
SAGE Publishing academic journals
English-language journals
Publications established in 1986
8 times per year journals